The Dong Dang–Tra Linh Expressway is a planned expressway in Vietnam. It will connect Đồng Đăng on the Chinese border with Trà Lĩnh, a border town further north. It will run roughly parallel to National Road 4A. The road is envisioned as a part of an economic corridor from Hai Phong to Chongqing and Europe through Khorgos. The government also expects the expressway to bring Cao Bằng Province economically and culturally closer to the political center Hanoi.

Development
Construction of the first 93 km from Tan Thanh to Phúc Sen, Quảng Hòa District, began in 2020, and should be completed by 2024. The remaining 22 km from Phúc Sen to Trà Lĩnh will start construction after the first phase has completed.

References

Expressways in Vietnam